The Washington-on-the-Brazos State Historic Site is a historic site at Washington-on-the-Brazos, Texas, where the Convention of 1836 adopted the Texas Declaration of Independence. The government of Texas purchased  of the old townsite in 1916 and built a replica of the building where the delegates met. The state acquired more of the site in 1976 and 1996.

Located between Brenham and Navasota off State Highway 105, the site is now known as Washington-on-the-Brazos State Historic Site. The site's visitor center is free and includes interactive exhibits about the Texas Revolution and the park's attractions, a gift shop, a conference center and an education center.

Barrington Living History Farm 
The Barrington Living History Farm is a living museum homestead that represents the mid-19th-century farm founded by Dr. Anson Jones, the last President of the Republic of Texas. Costumed interpreters raise cotton, corn, cattle and hogs using period techniques.  The 1844 Anson Jones Home was moved to the site in 1936 as part of the Texas Centennial Celebration. The reconstructed outbuildings include two slave cabins, a kitchen building, a smokehouse, a cotton house and a barn. The farmstead opened in 2000, and is operated by the Texas Parks and Wildlife Department.

References

Texas state historic sites